The first Mount Everest flight expedition was undertaken by Sir Douglas Douglas-Hamilton, Lord Clydesdale and David McIntyre in April 1933. They took off on an open cabin flight at 8:25 am on 3 April from Lalbalu Airfield and returned at 11:30  marking it as the first successful flight over Everest.  It was financed by Lucy, Lady Houston and organized by Stewart Blacker.

Background 
The idea for a flight expedition over the Mount Everest was proposed in 1918 by a British mountaineering physiologist, Alexander Kellas in his journal "The Possibility of Aerial Reconnaissance in the Himalaya." The attempt could not be made without significant funding and in September 1932 Lord Clydesdale visited Lady Houston at her Scottish shooting estate, Kinrara, to ask her to fund the expedition. He impressed her by dressing in his kilt for dinner. The strongly nationalistic Lady Houston was delighted with the idea that Clydesdale put forward, that the conquering of Everest by air would strengthen British rule in India. She agreed to fund the expedition and would remain closely involved at all stages, from England. Lord Clydesdale, Douglas-Hamilton, was the youngest squadron leader in the Royal Air Force who was born to Alfred, 13th Duke of Hamilton.  He commanded 602 Squadron and was Chief Pilot of the Houston Mount Everest Flying Expedition. Lieutenant David Fowler McIntyre was also of 602 Squadron.

Aircraft
The aircraft used in the expedition were the original Westland PV-6, (prototype of the Westland Wallace bomber), registered G-ACBR (and also known as the Houston-Wallace), along with the modified Westland PV-3, registered G-ACAZ. Both aircraft were modified with enclosed observer positions, but retained open pilot cockpits and were also equipped with oxygen systems and facilities for heated flying clothing. The aircraft were shipped to Karachi in a boat and flown to Purnea. It set milestones for developments in technology, aviation and photography.

Expeditions 
Observer Lieutenant Colonel Latham Valentine Stewart Blacker accompanied Lord Clydesdale and Sidney R. G. Bonnett, a cinematographer for Gaumont British News accompanied McIntyre. Bonnett, however lost consciousness due to hypoxia upon damaging his oxygen mask. The planes carried supplies to last 15 minutes over the mountains with inbuilt heating. The expeditors were dressed in multilayers of sheepskin clothing.

The first expedition could not obtain clear photographs because of dust. They made another attempt on April 19, 1933, the pictures of which assisted Edmund Hillary and Tenzing Norgay to the top of Mount Everest.

The camera used was a Williamson Automatic Eagle III which took photographs of the surface at specific intervals as the airplanes flew over known survey locations with the aim of obtaining a photographic mosaic of the terrain and an accurate map. The photographs of the expedition were made public in 1951. A documentary short film about the flight, Wings Over Everest, won an Oscar for live-action short film.

References

Further reading 
 First over Everest: The Houston – Mount Everest Expedition 1933, London & Manchester: Cherry Tree (Withy Grove Press), (1938), Fellowes, P. F. M. with L. V. Stewart Blacker and P. T. Etherton and the Marquess of Douglas and Clydesdale.

Mount Everest expeditions
April 1933 events
1933 in Nepal
1933 in Tibet